Ricky Champ (born 1 July 1980) is an English actor. He is known for his roles as Paul Parker in the BBC Three sitcom Him & Her, and Stuart Highway in the BBC soap opera EastEnders. Champ has also appeared in Crims, Plebs, and the sixth series of HBO series Game of Thrones where he played Gatins.

Selected filmography

Awards and nominations

References

External links

21st-century English male actors
Living people
English male television actors
English male soap opera actors
People from Southend-on-Sea
1980 births